"Kix" is the second single from Per Gessle's studio album The World According to Gessle.

Music video
The video was directed by Jonas Åkerlund and featured several short scenarios, which were repeated over and over throughout the song.

Track listings and formats
CD single (7243 8841652 8)
 "Kix"
 "Kix" (Lovely Pair Mix)
Maxi CD (7243 8841662 7)
 "Kix"
 "Kix" (Lovely Pair Mix)
 "Kix" (Horribly Pear-shaped mix)
 "Love Doesn't Live Here"
CD 1 UK (7243 8841662 7 / CDEM 501)
 "Kix"
 "Kix" (Lovely Pair Mix)
 "Kix" (Horribly Pear-shaped mix)
 "Love Doesn't Live Here"
CD 2 UK (7243 8848962 1 / CDEMS 501)
 "Kix"
 "Blue Umbrella" (demo)
 "Jupiter Calling" (demo)
 "Let's Party" (demo)

Charts

References

1997 singles
Per Gessle songs
Music videos directed by Jonas Åkerlund
Songs written by Per Gessle
1997 songs
EMI Records singles